This is a list of episodes for The Abbott and Costello Show.

Series overview

Episodes

Season 1 (1952–53)

Season 2 (1953–54)

External links
 

Abbott and Costello
Abbott and Costello Show